This is a list of flag bearers who have represented Monaco at the Olympics.

Flag bearers carry the national flag of their country at the opening ceremony of the Olympic Games.

See also
Monaco at the Olympics

References

Monaco at the Olympics
Monaco
Olympic flagbearers
Olympic flag bearers